Dream a Little Dream may refer to:

 Dream a Little Dream (film), a 1989 teen film
 Dream a Little Dream (Cass Elliot album), 1968
 Dream a Little Dream (Pink Martini and the von Trapps album), 2014
 Dream a Little Dream (Farscape episode), an episode of Farscape
 Dream a Little Dream (novel), a novel by Piers Anthony with Julie Brady
 "Dream a Little Dream" (The Grim Adventures of Billy & Mandy), a 2002 episode of The Grim Adventures of Billy & Mandy

See also 
 Dream a Little Dream of Me (disambiguation)